Asmik-kun Land (アスミッくん ランド Asumikkun Rando''') is a Famicom game published by Asmik in 1991.

A pink dinosaur named Asmik-kun (named "Boomer" in the English release of Boomer's Adventure in ASMIK World'') seeks to recover six fragments so he can wake the dragon ruler of the world and make Asmik Land a paradise.

References

External links

1991 video games
Action video games
Asmik Ace Entertainment games
Dinosaurs in video games
Japan-exclusive video games
Nintendo Entertainment System games
Nintendo Entertainment System-only games
Platform games
Video games developed in Japan